GTWR may refer to:

 Grand Trunk Western Railroad, a defunct railway
 Gross trailer weight rating, of road vehicle trailers
 Geographical and Temporal Weighted Regression, a type of regression analysis

See also
 GTW (disambiguation)